The second series of British science fiction programme Doctor Who began on 25 December 2005 with the Christmas special "The Christmas Invasion". Following the special, a regular series of thirteen episodes was broadcast, starting with "New Earth" on 15 April 2006. In addition, two short special episodes were produced; a Children in Need special and an interactive episode, as well as 13 TARDISODEs. It is the second series of the revival of the show, and the twenty-eighth season overall.

This is the first series to feature David Tennant as the tenth incarnation of the Doctor, an alien Time Lord who travels through time and space in his TARDIS, which appears to be a British police box on the outside. He continues to travel with his companion Rose Tyler (Billie Piper), with whom he has grown increasingly attached. They also briefly travel with Rose's boyfriend Mickey Smith (Noel Clarke), and Camille Coduri reprises her role as Rose's mother Jackie. The series is connected by a loose story arc consisting of the recurring word "Torchwood". This is also the first series to be preceded by a Christmas special, which was commissioned to see how well the show could do at Christmas. The success of "The Christmas Invasion" led to the Christmas special becoming an annual tradition.

Episodes

Supplemental episodes
Two mini-episodes were also recorded: "Doctor Who: Children in Need" was produced for the 2005 Children in Need appeal, and interactive episode "Attack of the Graske" was recorded for digital television following the broadcast of "The Christmas Invasion". 13 TARDISODEs were also produced to serve as prequels to each episode. All episodes were filmed as part of the second series' production cycle.

Casting

Main characters
Series two was David Tennant's first in the role of the Doctor after he was cast on 28 April 2005.  Following his brief appearance in the closing moments of "The Parting of the Ways" he was next seen in the Children in Need special, broadcast on 18 November 2005.  "The Christmas Invasion", broadcast one month later, marked his first full episode.

Billie Piper continued her role as companion Rose Tyler, for her second and final series, Noel Clarke's character Mickey Smith, a recurring guest character during the first series, featured in several episodes.

Guest stars

Camille Coduri continued to guest in the series as recurring character Jackie Tyler. Shaun Dingwall returned for several episodes as Pete Tyler and Penelope Wilton reprised her role as Harriet Jones for the Christmas special.

Elisabeth Sladen featured in the episode "School Reunion", returning to the character of Sarah Jane Smith, companion of the Third and Fourth Doctors. John Leeson also featured in this episode as the voice of K9.

Other guest stars included Adam Garcia, Daniel Evans, Zoë Wanamaker, Sean Gallagher, Anna Hope, Adjoa Andoh, Pauline Collins, Anthony Head, Sophia Myles, Roger Lloyd-Pack, Andrew Hayden-Smith, Helen Griffin, Don Warrington, Maureen Lipman, Jamie Foreman, Rory Jennings, Margaret John, Danny Webb, Shaun Parkes, Claire Rushbrook, Will Thorp, Marc Warren, Peter Kay, Shirley Henderson, Simon Greenall, Moya Brady, Kathryn Drysdale, Nina Sosanya, Tracy-Ann Oberman, Raji James, Barbara Windsor, Derek Acorah, Alistair Appleton, Trisha Goddard, and Freema Agyeman, who returned to co-star as Martha Jones the next year.

Production

Development
Following the success of the opening episode of the first series, the BBC announced that Doctor Who had been recommissioned for both a second series and a Christmas special on 30 March 2005. Recording for the Christmas special began on 23 July 2005, with production on the series itself beginning on 1 August 2005 and concluding on 31 March 2006.

Writing
New writers for the show included Toby Whithouse, creator of the Channel 4 drama No Angels, Tom MacRae, creator of Sky One's Mile High, Matt Jones, also a prolific script editor and producer, and Matthew Graham, co-creator of the BBC science fiction series Life on Mars. Previous writers Mark Gatiss, Steven Moffat and Russell T Davies all contributed to the series, with Davies continuing to act as head writer and executive producer. Stephen Fry was due to write episode 11 but was forced to withdraw as he could not complete the script in time so Russell T. Davies hired Matthew Graham to write Fear Her. Phil Collinson produced all episodes, with Julie Gardner as executive producer. The series was directed by James Hawes, Euros Lyn, James Strong, Dan Zeff and Graeme Harper, who had directed episodes of the programme's original run. The series is primarily set on Earth (though not as much as the first series was) due to the cost involved in creating another planet, according to Davies. Only two stories are set on another planet.

The second series encompassed a loose story arc based around the word "Torchwood", which first appeared in the 2005 episode "Bad Wolf". The mythology of Torchwood is built across the series; in "The Christmas Invasion" it is revealed to be a secret organisation which possesses alien technology, and its establishment is shown in "Tooth and Claw". Contemporary Torchwood is finally visited by the Doctor and Rose in "Army of Ghosts"/"Doomsday", at which point it is situated within London's Canary Wharf and accidentally allows the invasion of the Cybermen and, subsequently, the Daleks. The Doctor and Rose are forcibly separated by these events, which lead to Rose's entrapment within a parallel universe.

The Doctor and Rose are indirectly responsible for their separation; their enjoyment of the events of "Tooth and Claw" horrifies Queen Victoria and leads to the establishment of Torchwood. Over a century later, the institute's foolish actions are resolved at the expense of the Doctor and Rose's companionship. "It's deliberate when that happens [The Doctor and Rose's arrogance]", said head writer Russell T Davies, "and they do pay the price. In "Tooth and Claw", they set up the very thing — Torchwood — that separates them in the end. It's sort of their own fault."

Music
Murray Gold returned to compose the music for Series 2. Ben Foster orchestrated the music, unlike in the first series, which had used synthesised music.

Filming

Production blocks were arranged as follows:

Release

Broadcast
The second series premiered on 15 April 2006 with "New Earth", and concluded after 13 episodes on 8 July 2006 with "Doomsday". Doctor Who Confidential also aired alongside each episode of the series, continuing on from the previous series.

A Children in Need special and an interactive episode, entitled "Attack of the Graske", were both produced alongside the series. A series of 13 TARDISODEs were also produced. These mini-episodes (approximately 60 seconds in length) served as prequels to each forthcoming episode, and were available for download to mobile phones and viewable at the official Doctor Who website. The TARDISODEs were recorded intermittently from 31 January to 8 April 2006.

Home media

In print

Reception

Critical reception

Awards and nominations

Soundtrack

Notes

References

External links

 
 
 

2006 British television seasons
Series 02
 
Series 02